Jeffrey Bub (born 1942) is a physicist and philosopher of physics, and Distinguished Professor in the Department of Philosophy, the Joint Center for Quantum Information and Computer Science, and the Institute for Physical Science and Technology at the University of Maryland, College Park.

He obtained his bachelor's degree in pure mathematics and physics from the University of Cape Town. A scholarship allowed him to work at Birkbeck College with David Bohm who had profound intellectual influence on his work. Bub obtained his PhD in Mathematical Physics from London University in 1966. Before taking up his position as professor at the University of Maryland in 1986, he worked at the University of Minnesota, Yale University, Tel Aviv University, and the University of Western Ontario. He has been visiting professor at Princeton University, Yale University, the University of California at Irvine, the CPNSS at the London School of Economics, the University of California at San Diego, the Perimeter Institute for Theoretical Physics, and the Institute for Quantum Optics and Quantum Information at the University of Vienna.

His main research interests relate to quantum foundations, quantum information, quantum computation, and quantum cryptography. In 1998, his book Interpreting the Quantum World won the Lakatos Award. In 2005 he received the University of Maryland's Kirwan Faculty Research and Scholarship Prize for his work in the area of quantum foundations and quantum information.

Bub has published over 100 scientific articles; the first of these are three articles authored together with David Bohm and published in 1966 and 1968. In 2010, he published an argument that the famous work of John Stewart Bell (and, thus, Grete Hermann) had misconstrued von Neumann's proof of the impossibility of hidden variables in quantum mechanics. The validity of Bub's argument is, in turn, disputed.

Publications
Books
Jeffrey Bub: Bananaworld: Quantum Mechanics for Primates, Oxford University Press, 2016, 
Jeffrey Bub: Interpreting the Quantum World, Cambridge University Press, 1997,  (revised paperback edition, 1999) – Review by Kent A. Peacock
Jeffrey Bub: The Interpretation of Quantum Mechanics (The Western Ontario Series in Philosophy of Science), Springer, 1974, 
Jeffrey Bub: 

Other
William Demopoulos and Itamar Pitowsky (eds.): Physical Theory and its Interpretation: Essays in Honor of Jeffrey Bub, Springer, 2006,

References

External links
Jeffrey Bub, CV at John Templeton Foundation
Jeffrey Bub, homepage and List of publications
Jeffrey Bub, Department of Philosophy, University of Maryland
Works by Jeffrey Bub, philpapers.org
Jeffrey Bub, Rob Clifton: A uniqueness theorem for “No collapse” interpretations of quantum mechanics, Stud. Hist. Mod. Phys., vol. 27, no. 2, pp. 181–219, 1996
Lectures by Jeffrey Bub, PIRSA, Perimeter Institute

1942 births
21st-century American physicists
Philosophers of science
Living people
20th-century American philosophers
University of Maryland, College Park faculty
Lakatos Award winners